Erik Wesseltoft (born 1944) is a Norwegian jazz guitarist and composer, married to pharmacist Randi Ersdal (1944–), and the father of jazz pianist Bugge Wesseltoft (1964–).

Biography 
Wesseltoft was born in Porsgrunn. As a guitarist, he has played a modest but important role in Norwegian jazz and theater music. In 2004 his first album, Con Amore, was released, and in 2013 the follow-up To Someone I Knew. His world-famous son, Bugge Wesseltoft, contributes elpiano and piano on both records. In addition Vidar Johansen and Harald Johnsen contributed on the 2004 edition, and Carl Magnus Neumann contributed on the 2013 album, in addition to well known musicians like Knut Riisnæs, Roger Arntzen, and Frode Nymo.

Discography 
 2004: Con Amore (Normann Records)
 2013: To Someone I Knew (Normann Records)

References

External links 
 

1944 births
Living people
Norwegian civil servants
Norwegian jazz guitarists
Musicians from Porsgrunn